There have been two baronetcies created for persons with the surname Barrow, one in the Baronetage of Great Britain and one in the Baronetage of the United Kingdom.

The Barrow Baronetcy, of Hygrove in the County of Gloucester, was created in the Baronetage of Great Britain on 22 January 1784. For more information on this creation, see Crawley-Boevey baronets.

The Barrow Baronetcy, of Ulverstone in the County of Lancaster, was created in the Baronetage of the United Kingdom on 30 March 1835 for the statesman John Barrow. He was succeeded by his son, the second Baronet. He was Chief Clerk at the Colonial Office. As of 2009 the baronetcy is held by his great-great-great-grandson (the title having descended from father to son), the seventh Baronet, who succeeded in 2009.

Barrow baronets, of Ulverstone (1835)
Sir John Barrow, 1st Baronet (1764–1848)
Sir George Barrow, 2nd Baronet (1806–1876)
Sir John Croker Barrow, 3rd Baronet (1833–1900)
Sir Francis Laurence John Barrow, 4th Baronet (1862–1950)
Sir Wilfred John Wilson Croker Barrow, 5th Baronet (1897–1960)
Sir Richard John Uniacke Barrow, 6th Baronet (1933–2009)
Sir Anthony John Grenfell Barrow, 7th Baronet (born 1962)

The heir presumptive to the baronetcy is John Lendon Barrow (born 1934).  He is the eldest son of the 3rd son of the 4th Baronet.

References

www.thepeerage.com

Baronetcies in the Baronetage of the United Kingdom